The 2011 Cornell Big Red football team represented Cornell University in the 2011 NCAA Division I FCS football season as a member of the Ivy League. They were led by second-year head coach Kent Austin and played their home games at Schoellkopf Field. Cornell finished the season 5–5 overall and 3–4 in Ivy League play to place sixth. Cornell  averaged 7,145 fans per game.

Schedule

Roster

References

Cornell
Cornell Big Red football seasons
Cornell Big Red football